Daniel Webster Council is a division of the Boy Scouts of America that serves all of New Hampshire.

History
In 1912, two years after the Boy Scouts of America were founded in the United States, the Manchester Council (#330), a volunteer-led council was organized.  Initially there were only two troops, both of them chartered by the YMCA.  As Scouting grew in popularity, three more makeshift and unrecognized councils sprang up in Dover, Claremont, and Portsmouth.  The council grew steadily and added a Scout Executive to its staff in 1919.

On January 9, 1920, the Manchester Council was granted an official charter with the Boy Scouts of America.  At that time, the council represented ten troops and 256 Scouts within Manchester, and 87 troops with a total of 1621 Scouts in New Hampshire.  In 1925, the Manchester Council acquired Camp Manning in Gilmanton for use as a summer camp.  While the Manchester Council grew rapidly, the rest of New Hampshire's Scouting program saw limited growth.

On May 25, 1929, the Manchester Council was renamed the Daniel Webster Council (#330),and expanded to cover Scouting for the entire state.  The new name was derived from New Hampshire statesman Daniel Webster.

Organization
The Daniel Webster Council is divided into eight geographical districts:
 Abnaki District
 Arrowhead District
 Historic District
 Massabesic District
 Mt Monadnock District
 Sunapee District
 Wannalancit District
 Nutfield District- dissolved as of 1/1/2019 - Towns split between Historic, Arrowhead, and Massabesic Districts
 Exploring Division

Camps

Griswold Scout Reservation
Griswold Scout Reservation is a Scouting reservation located near Gilmanton Iron Works, New Hampshire, United States. There are two summer camps located within it: Hidden Valley Scout Camp and Camp Bell.

In 1971, the Daniel Webster Council acquired what was then called the Hidden Valley Scout Reservation. In 2000, the camp acquired additional land, which it named Camp Bell, and the total reservation was renamed Griswold Hidden Valley Scout Reservation.

Hidden Valley is run as a traditional Scout camp with full dining facilities and a wide variety of program areas and activities. Camp Bell is run with a higher emphasis on strengthening the Patrol Method. Campers do their own cooking in their sites, and participate in day-long activities as patrols. Camp Bell has a different variety of activities from Hidden Valley, including their "living history areas", and a different set of merit badges are available.

The land currently used primarily by Camp Bell has been used as the homes of many other camps, most recently Camp Manning, which after being sold by the Daniel Webster Council to private owners, changed ownership several times and had previously existed as a camp run by various organization such as the YMCA who called it Camp Leo. Camp Bell was named for a member of the council's executive board who was instrumental in reacquiring the property for the council.

Camp Carpenter
Camp Carpenter is the Cub Scout Summer camp located in Manchester, New Hampshire. It has a dining hall, a swimming lake and ample tent space. It is also home to the Lawrence L. Lee Scouting Museum.

Unity Program Center
The Unity Program Center is a five-acre property with an indoor facility, an outdoor stage and camping and event areas located on Mica Mine Road in Unity, New Hampshire.

Passaconaway Lodge
The Order of the Arrow is represented by the Passaconaway Lodge #220.

On June 10, 1942, the Passaconaway Lodge was organized at Camp Manning. 43 members were inducted that year. The totem of the lodge was chosen as the bear since the Native word Passaconaway means "the child of the bear". Election of the first lodge officers took place.
 
The mission of this lodge is to fulfill the purpose of the Order of the Arrow as an integral part of the Boy Scouts of America through positive youth leadership under the guidance of selected, capable adults.

See also 

Scouting in New Hampshire

References

Local councils of the Boy Scouts of America
1920 establishments in the United States
Youth organizations established in 1920
Northeast Region (Boy Scouts of America)